"King of New Orleans" is the lead single from the 1996 Better Than Ezra studio album, Friction, Baby. It was released as a commercial single in 1996.

Reception
"King of New Orleans" spent seventeen weeks on the Billboard Modern Rock Tracks chart, peaking at No. 5. The single also reached No. 62 on the Billboard Hot 100 Airplay chart.

Chart performance

References

1996 singles
Better Than Ezra songs
Songs written by Kevin Griffin
1996 songs
Elektra Records singles